Hellinsia wrangeliensis is a moth of the family Pterophoridae. It is found in Russia (where it was described from Wrangel Island).

References 

Moths described in 1985
wrangeliensis
Moths of Asia